Newell Smith Wallbank (26 April 1875 - 23 June 1945) was a British composer of pipe organ music. He was an Organist of Wakefield Cathedral from 1930 until his death in 1945.

Early life
Wallbank was born in Oakworth, Yorkshire as the son of William Wallbank. He studied the organ under the tutelage of  Edwin Crow at Ripon Cathedral.

He married Alice Mary Batt, the daughter of Albert Batt, on 14 March 1913, at St George's Church, Leeds; they had a son, the Revd Prebendary Newell Eddius Wallbank (1914-1996), who married the educationalist Phyllis Wallbank.

Appointments

Organist of All Souls, Blackman Lane, Leeds until 1911
Organist of Hexham Abbey 1911 - 1917
Organist of St Margaret's Church, Altrincham 1917 - 1918 (Patron: the Earl of Stamford) 
Organist of Hexham Abbey 1918 - 1926
Organist of Lancaster Priory 1926 - 1928
Organist of St Mary's Church, Scarborough 1928 - 1930
Organist of Wakefield Cathedral 1930 - 1945.

Compositions
Wallbank composed many works including:
Six Choral Preludes for the Organ
Concerto Grosso for String Orchestra
Partita in E for String Orchestra.

See also 
 List of musicians at English cathedrals

References

1875 births
1945 deaths
English organists
British male organists